Friarage Hospital is a 189-bed hospital located in Northallerton, North Yorkshire, England. The hospital is run by the South Tees Hospitals NHS Foundation Trust and is one of six hospitals in the trust's portfolio.

In April 2020, the Accident and Emergency section of the hospital was downgraded into an Urgent Treatment Centre (UTC), with the most serious of casualty cases being taken to other hospitals.

History
The hospital was opened in 1938, and had been built on the site of a Carmelite friary, though some of the still extant buildings on the site were part of the Northallerton Workhouse. It was originally intended that civilian casualties of bombing raids on Teesside would be brought to the hospital for treatment. Between 1943 and 1947, it served as RAF Hospital Northallerton, as part of the chain of Royal Air Force hospitals across the world. It was returned to civilian use in 1947 before being renamed as the Friarage in 1948 when the National Health Service was formed. Student training for nurses was initiated in January 1949. The Northallerton Health Services NHS Trust was established in 1991 and ran the hospital until April 2002, when it merged with South Tees Hospital Trust. One year after the merger of the trusts, the Friarage received an £18 million facelift.

In July 1999, the hospital acquired a Military Defence Hospital Unit after the closure of the Duchess of Kent's Military Hospital at Catterick Garrison. Military medical personnel still work at the Friarage with other military staff also undertaking some clinical tasks at James Cook University Hospital.

In November 2012, all surgery was stopped at the Friarage due to a flood. A stream, known as Sun Beck, flows through the town and is covered over from just outside the hospital to a car park west of the High Street in Northallerton. The flood led to the North Yorkshire Fire and Rescue Service having to pump the water away from the hospital into another stream to the north west of the town.

In 2017, overnight Accident and Emergency admissions were sent to James Cook University Hospital. This led to some people to labelling the scheme as "closure by stealth". The accident and emergency department was downgraded to a 24/7 Urgent Treatment Centre (UTC) in February 2019 because of staff shortages. Average attendance is about 60 a day. After a public consultation, the UTC was made permanent in April 2020.

Facilities
The hospital serves a region that stretches from the top of York to the town of Darlington and incorporates most of the central band of North Yorkshire up to the central Pennines in the west.

When last inspected by the Care Quality Commission in June 2016, the CQC determined that hospital was performing to a Good standard.

A new cancer treatment centre called The Sir Robert Ogden Macmillan Cancer Centre is located on the site. Jointly funded by Sir Robert Ogden and Macmillan Cancer Relief, the centre cost £10 million and brings cancer care, treatment and counselling under one roof. The centre was due to open in October 2018, but was delayed until 11 December 2018.

Controversies
In 2000, a consultant who had worked at the hospital between 1985 and 1998, was struck off by the General Medical Council (GMC) for botching 12 operations on women whilst he was working at the hospital. Some of the women were left in "agonising pain" and, in some cases, the women were not able to have children afterwards. The Friarage had decided to bring medical malpractice charges against the consultant, but his lawyer had advised the hospital that the legal action could take years. The hospital paid the consultant off and gave him a good appraisal which allowed him to carry on working at another hospital in England before charges were brought by the GMC. It was since revealed that he had also been struck off the medical register in Canada for "serious incompetence" involving the deaths of two women. In 2000, the hospital sacked another doctor who had been having an affair with one of his patients. The second consultant had been hired to replace the previous consultant who had been paid off. 
 
In 2012, South Tees Hospitals NHS Foundation Trust announced plans to downgrade the maternity services offered by the hospital. North Yorkshire County Council asked the Health Secretary, Jeremy Hunt MP, to review the proposals in December 2012. The plans led to a march through Northallerton town centre by 4,000 people, at the end of which one of the many speeches given opposing the plans, was by William Hague, who was still the MP for Richmond.

In May 2014, Jeremy Hunt approved the plan to switch from a consultant-led maternity department to one that was led by midwives. The plan was very unpopular with the local community and whilst it would not mean the cessation of maternity services, those pregnant mothers with illnesses or complications would have to travel a further  to James Cook University Hospital.

Notes

References

External links
Care Quality Commission's report into Friarage Hospital June 2016

Hospital buildings completed in 1938
Hospitals in North Yorkshire
NHS hospitals in England
1938 establishments in England
Hospitals established in 1938
Northallerton